Richard II de Bermingham (died 1580) was an Anglo-Irish lord.

Richard had one of the longest terms as lord, but it was during these years that Athenry came to decline. The succession crisis of the second Earl of Clanricarde and the subsequent Mac an Iarla wars, devastate his lordship, to the point where he admitted to Sir Henry Sidney that though his was the oldest Anglo-Irish lordship in Connacht, he and his people were reduced to penury; he was "as poor a baron as liveth".

Two of the worst events were the 1572 Sack of Athenry and its destruction by Aodh mac Maghnusa Ó Domhnaill in 1577. While in the 1540s there were above three hundred prosperous houses in the town, there were by the 1570s less than forty, now of quality and many of their inhabitants ready to leave.

In response to the unrest, Richard permanently shifted the location of the lordship to Dunmore, at the northern extent of his rule. The family would be based in the area henceforth, though still owning land and property in Athenry and its environs.

Richard died in 1580, but was so insignificant that his death was not reported in the annals. He married Catherine O'Kelly, and had a son Edmond, 10th Baron.

References
 History of Galway, James Hardiman, Galway, 1820
 The Abbey of Athenry, Martin J. Blake, Journal of the Galway Archaeological and Historical Society, volume II, part ii, 1902
 The Birmingham family of Athenry, H.T. Knox, J.G.A.H.S., volume ten, numbers iii and iv, 1916-17.
 Remarks on the walls and church of Athenry, Charles Mac Neill, J.G.A.H.S., volume 11, numbers iii and iv, 1921
 Old Galway, Maureen Donovan O'Sullivan, 1942.
 Punann Arsa:The Story of Athenry, County Galway, Martin Finnerty, Ballinasloe, 1951.
 Athenry: A Medieval Irish Town, Etienne Rynne, Athenry Historical Society, Athenry, 1992

People from County Galway
Barons Athenry
Richard II
1580 deaths